Dierks may refer to:

Dierks, Arkansas, a city in Howard County, Arkansas
Dierks Lake, a body of water near Dierks, AR
Dierks Bentley (born 1975), an American musician
Dierks Bentley (album), released in 2003
Dieter Dierks (born 1943), a German record producer